Little Lorraine is a small village located on the east coast of Cape Breton, Nova Scotia, Canada.

It is known to have had several different names in the past such as Little Loran, Lorembec, Cap-de-Lorembec, Petit Laurenbec and between 1750-51 Petit Lorembec was in use. In a 1756 census, there were 22 families living in Little Lorraine – all in the fishery business. It was founded in 1714 and has a population of approximately 62 people. It is 8.9 km from the small community of Louisbourg

The small village is known for its rough seas and heavy fog. The Irish immigrant sailing ship Astraea ran aground at night May 8, 1834, in Lorraine Head. 
 
Commanded and owned by Captain William Ridley, on a voyage from Limerick, Ireland to Quebec it quickly broke up, killing 251 people. The shores were scattered with nude corpses. Some were buried in an unmarked unknown mass burial near the wreck site. There were only three survivors — a surgeon, a carpenter and a seaman.
The ship was British in nationality, built in 1812. There lies a plaque on the ocean floor in memory of the people who died aboard the ship. A monument stands in place on Little Lorraine road on a grassy hill between 2 brooks.

Settlement began in the early 1700s by French Acadians, fishermen from France (Brittany and Normandy). In 1734, nineteen heads of households, thirteen of whom were from The Gulf of St. Malo, France. In 1752 there were men and families who also came from Bayeux, France. They were all in the fishing industry. There was a French Acadian family who settled in Little Lorraine at around 1733, the Yvons. The British came to Little Lorraine and deported him and his family in 1758, at around the time of the expulsion of French Canadians from the Maritimes by the British. In 1745, twenty Englishmen were surrounded in Little Lorraine by 40–50 Indians accompanied by three Frenchmen. Most were shot down, some surrendered to live another day, some were tortured. They came and forced them out, they were deported on ships, and their houses were burned down. In the early to mid-1800s Irish immigrants came to settle in Little Lorraine.

The village is mostly of Roman Catholics. Ste-Claire Catholic Church was built in 1726 in Little Lorraine. The church is no longer standing as it has burnt down. Original records of the church are located in the Archives Nationales (National Archives Overseas) located in Aix-en-Provence, France.

it is home to the popular walking trails Gooseberry Cove and Wild Cove.

See also
 List of communities in the Cape Breton Regional Municipality - Populations

References

External links

 Astraea shipwreck
 Shipwreck Asterisk 
 Little Lorraine to Louisbourg
 Petit Lorembec ambush of Englishmen
 Shipwrecks of Nova Scotia 
 The shipwreck Astrea

Communities in the Cape Breton Regional Municipality
General Service Areas in Nova Scotia